Limacella glischra is a mushroom species in the family Amanitaceae. It was first named as a species of Lepiota by Andrew Price Morgan in 1906; William Alphonso Murrill transferred it to Limacella in 1914.

References

External links

Amanitaceae
Fungi described in 1906
Fungi of North America